MG JW Automobile Pakistan Pvt Ltd operating as MG Motors Pakistan is a Pakistani automobile manufacturer and joint venture between JW-SEZ Group and SAIC motors.

History 
MG JW Automobile Pakistan is owned by JW Auto Park, which in turn owned by Javed Afridi. MG JW Automobile Pakistan has signed Memorandum of Understanding (MoU) with Morris Garages (MG) Motor UK Limited, owned by SAIC Motor to bring electric vehicles in Pakistan. It will establish Electric car manufacturing plant. MG Motors has launched two models namely MG HS, MG ZS and MG ZS EV in Pakistan in 2020.

Launching Ceremony 
Prime Minister Imran Khan inaugurates MG JW Automobile.

JW-SEZ Raiwind 
Board of Investment (BoI) has approved the MG JW Automobile Pakistan Pvt Ltd to manufacture electric vehicles in country’s first private Special Economic Zone (SEZ) in Raiwind.

Operations in Pakistan 
MG Motors in Pakistan faced a delay in spare parts supply, which led to a backlog of customer orders and potential production disruptions. According to a report, the company was taking measures to address the issue, including working with its suppliers and expediting shipments. However, some customers experienced significant delays in receiving their orders, which could have negatively impacted the company's reputation and sales figures.

In 2021, the Federal Board of Revenue (FBR) investigated MG Motors in Pakistan for under-invoicing vehicles to evade taxes. The investigation was launched in response to a complaint from a customs clearing agent, who claimed that the company was involved in fraudulent practices. The FBR conducted a thorough investigation and found evidence of under-invoicing, resulting in the imposition of heavy fines and penalties on the company. MG Motors denied any wrongdoing and stated that they were committed to following all relevant laws and regulations.

In the beginning of 2023, The retail price of MG Essence increased by 19% in Pakistan due to an increase in custom duties.

Electric Vehicles 
JW-SEZ Group and SAIC motors are making Pakistan a part of global EV revolution.

Products 

 MG ZS EV (Subcompact Crossover SUV)
MG ZS (Subcompact Crossover SUV)
 MG HS (Compact Crossover SUV)

See also 

 Automotive industry in Pakistan
Electric vehicle industry in Pakistan
MG Cars

References

Suzuki
Car manufacturers of Pakistan
Economy of Lahore
SAIC Motor joint ventures
MG vehicles
MG Motor
Pakistani subsidiaries of foreign companies